Sachin Yardi is a Hindi film director and screenwriter from India. His directorial debut C Kkompany (2008) was after writing scripts for Kyaa Kool Hai Hum (2005) and Madhur Bhandarkar's award-winning Traffic Signal (2007).

Filmography

References 

Hindi-language film directors
Living people
Year of birth missing (living people)
Hindi screenwriters
21st-century Indian film directors